Philip Witte (born 29 July 1984 in Hamburg) is a field hockey player from Germany. He was a member of the Men's National Team that won the gold medal at the 2008 Summer Olympics.

References
The Official Website of the Beijing 2008 Olympic Games

External links
 

1984 births
Living people
German male field hockey players
Olympic field hockey players of Germany
Field hockey players at the 2008 Summer Olympics
Olympic gold medalists for Germany
Olympic medalists in field hockey
Medalists at the 2008 Summer Olympics
2010 Men's Hockey World Cup players
21st-century German people